Mary Ann Bickerdyke (July 19, 1817 – November 8, 1901), also known as Mother Bickerdyke, was a hospital administrator for Union soldiers during the American Civil War and a lifelong advocate for veterans.  She was responsible for establishing 300 field hospitals during the war and served as a lawyer assisting veterans and their families with obtaining pensions after the war.

Early life
Mary Ann Ball was born on July 19, 1817, in Knox County, Ohio, to Hiram and Annie Rodgers Ball. She is cited as one of the first women who attended Oberlin College in Ohio, but official records show no proof of attendance. In 1847, she married Robert Bickerdyke, who died in 1859, two years before the Civil War. Together, the Bickerdykes had two sons.

She later moved to Galesburg, Illinois, where she worked as botanic physician and primarily worked with alternative medicines using herbs and plants. Bickerdyke began to attend the Congregational Church in Galesburg shortly after she became a widow.

Civil War service

Mary Bickerdyke served in the Civil War from June 9, 1861 to March 20, 1865, working in a total of nineteen battles. Bickerdyke was described as a determined nurse who did not let anyone stand in the way of her duties. Her patients, the enlisted soldiers, referred to her as "Mother" Bickerdyke because of her caring nature. When a surgeon questioned her authority to take some action, she replied, "On the authority of Lord God Almighty, have you anything that outranks that?" In reality, her authority came from her reputation with the Sanitary Commission and her popularity with the enlisted men.

Dr. Woodward, a surgeon with the 22nd Illinois Infantry and a friend of Bickerdyke's, wrote home about the filthy, chaotic military hospitals at Cairo, Illinois.  The letter was read aloud in their church and Galesburg's citizens collected $500 worth of supplies and selected Bickerdyke to deliver them (no one else would go).   After meeting Mary Livermore, she was appointed a field agent for the Northwestern branch of the Sanitary Commission. Livermore also helped Bickerdyke find care for her two sons in Beloit, Wisconsin, while she was in the field with the army during the later part of the war.  Her sons complained about living in Beloit. She stayed in Cairo as a nurse, and while there, she organized the hospitals and gained Grant's appreciation. Grant endorsed her efforts and detailed soldiers to her hospital train, and when his army moved down the Mississippi, Bickerdyke went, too, setting up hospitals where they were needed. Bickerdyke became a matron of the hospital in only five months.

She later joined a field hospital at Fort Donelson, working alongside Mary J. Safford. Bickerdyke cites Fort Donelson, specifically February 15 and 16, as the first battle she witnessed. At Fort Donelson, she realized that laundry services were lacking in the field hospitals.  She packed up the soiled clothes and bedding that had been used by the men, added disinfectants, and sent it on a steamer bound for Pittsburg Landing to be cleaned by the Chicago Sanitary Commission.  She also requested that her colleagues in Chicago send washing machines, portable kettles, and mangles.  She then organized escaped and former slaves to provide laundry services for the hospitals she set up in the field.

After serving at Fort Donelson, she was appointed matron at Gayoso Block Hospital in Memphis. Gayoso had 900 patients, including 400 Native Americans. Like her other hospitals, "Mother" Bickerdyke employed escaped and former slaves at Gayoso.  She had left Gayoso to run errands and returned to find the medical director had sent away the escaped and former slaves who helped her provide care for the hospital's patients.  She left for dinner but did not return right away.  Rather, she visited General Hurlbut's headquarters.  She was given written authority to keep her employees until such time as Hurlbut himself revoked the order. She also set about acquiring cows and hens to provide dairy products for the hospital.  General Hurlbut set aside President's Island for their pasture and the escaped and former slaves cared for the animals.

Bickerdyke also worked closely with Eliza Emily Chappell Porter of Chicago's Northwestern branch of the United States Sanitary Commission. She later worked on the first hospital boat. During the war, she became chief of nursing under the command of General Ulysses S. Grant, and served at the Battle of Vicksburg.  As chief of nursing, Bickerdyke sometimes deliberately ignored military procedure, and when Grant's staff complained about her behavior, Union Gen. William T. Sherman reportedly threw up his hands and exclaimed, "She outranks me. I can't do a thing in the world." Sherman acknowledged that she was "one of his best generals" and other officers referred to her as the "Brigadier Commanding Hospitals." Sherman was especially fond of this volunteer nurse, who followed the western armies. Bickerdyke held the favor of both General Sherman and General Grant, who often provided her whatever she requested of them.

On October 27, 1863, Bickerdyke reported to Chattanooga and was witness to the battle of Lookout Mountain, nicknamed "the battle above the clouds." "I watched the dreadful combat until the clouds hid all from view," she wrote in a letter to Mary Holland, "In fancy I can hear General Hooker's artillery now." Bickerdyke set up the field hospital of the Fifteenth Army Corps for the Battle of Missionary Ridge, where she was the only female attendant for four weeks. Part of her work during this campaign was to collect personal items of soldiers killed in battle and return them to the soldiers' homes. On the march to capture Atlanta, Georgia, despite General Sherman's orders to inflict "all the damage you can against [the enemy's] war resource," Bickerdyke worked to build hospitals for Confederate soldiers.

By the end of the war, with the help of the U.S. Sanitary Commission, Mother Bickerdyke had built 300 hospitals and aided the wounded on 19 battlefields including the Battle of Shiloh and Sherman's March to the Sea. "Mother" Bickerdyke was so loved by the army that the soldiers would cheer her when she appeared. At Sherman's request, she rode at the head of the XV Corps in the Grand Review of the Armies in Washington at the end of the war.

After the War

After the war ended, Bickerdyke was employed in several domains.  She worked at the Home for the Friendless in Chicago, Illinois in 1866. With the aid of Colonel Charles Hammond who was president of the Chicago, Burlington, and Quincy Railroad, she helped fifty veterans' families move to Salina, Kansas as homesteaders.  She ran a hotel there with the aid of General Sherman.  Originally known as the Salina Dining Hall, it came to be called the Bickerdyke House. Later, she became an attorney, helping Union veterans with legal problems, including obtaining pensions.

General Logan helped her get a job in the San Francisco Mint.  She also worked for the Salvation Army there. While in California, she was elected as the first president of Lyon Women's Relief Corps, No. 6 of Oakland, California.  She declined, but is on their membership rolls as a charter member.

Bickerdyke received a special pension of $25 a month from Congress after Mary Livermore lobbied on her behalf. This special bill was introduced by Representative Long of Massachusetts.  Generals Grant, Sherman, Pope, and Long testified on it.  The bill passed on May 9, 1886.

Bickerdyke retired to Bunker Hill, Kansas to live with her son. In 1901, she died peacefully after a minor stroke and was buried in Galesburg.

Legacy
Bickerdyke is featured in a memoir of the war, written by Mary Livermore and published in 1887, entitled My Story of the War. Livermore was an official in the U.S. Sanitation Commission.

Clara Barton wrote a poem entitled "The Women Who Went to the Field" that honored Bickerdyke, Cornelia Hancock, Dorothea Dix, Mary Livermore, and Annie Etheridge.

Statues of her have been erected in Galesburg, Illinois and in Mount Vernon, Ohio. The United States government recognized her military achievements with a hospital ship and liberty ship named the SS Mary Bickerdyke launched in October 1943.

The Seminary/Kellogg Street overpass in Galesburg, Illinois opened on November 30, 2014 and is officially named "Bickerdyke Bridge".

Notes

References

Further reading
 Bergeron, Destiny. Women in Blue: The Story of Three Women from Illinois Who Fought in the Civil War. Thesis (B.A.)--Lake Forest College, 2002. 
 Brockett, L. P. Woman's Work in the Civil War: A Record of Heroism, Patriotism and Patience. Philadelphia: Zeigler, McCurdy & Co, 1867. 
 Brockett, L. P., and Mary C. Vaughan. Heroines of the Rebellion; Or, Woman's Work in the Civil War; a Record of Heroism, Patriotism and Patience. [N.p.]: Edgewood Pub. Co, n.d. 
 Brockett, L. P., and Mary C. Vaughan. The Angels of the Battlefields: The Florence Nightingales of the U.S. Civil War. Liskeard, Cornwall, U.K.: Diggory Press, 2006.  
 Bullough, Vern L., Olga Maranjian Church, Alice P. Stein, and Lilli Sentz. American Nursing: A Biographical Dictionary. New York: Garland, 1988.  
 Davis, Margaret B. Mother Bickerdyke: Her Life and Labors for the Relief of Our Soldiers : Sketches of Battle Scenes and Incidents of the Sanitary Service. San Francisco, Cal: A.T. Dewey, 1886.  Available online from Internet Archive
 Dodge, Bertha S. The Story of Nursing. Boston: Little, Brown, 1965. 
 Eggleston, Larry G. Women in the Civil War: Extraordinary Stories of Soldiers, Spies, Nurses, Doctors, Crusaders, and Others. Jefferson, N.C.: McFarland, 2003.  
 Favor, Lesli J. Women Doctors and Nurses of the Civil War. New York: Rosen Pub. Group, 2004.  
 Frank, Lisa Tendrich. Women in the American Civil War. Santa Barbara, Calif: ABC-CLIO, 2008.  
 Garrison, Webb B. Amazing Women of the Civil War. Nashville, Tenn.: Rutledge Hill Press, 1999.  
 Gordon, Sarah H. Bickerdyke, Mary Ann Ball. Oxford: Oxford University Press, 2000.
 Harper, Judith E. Women During the Civil War: An Encyclopedia. New York: Routledge, 2004.  
 Highlights of the Civil War, 1861–1865. Peterborough, NH: Cobblestone Magazine, 1981. 
 James, Edward T., Janet Wilson James, and Paul S. Boyer. Notable American Women, 1607–1950 A Biographical Dictionary. Cambridge, Mass: Belknap Press of Harvard University Press, 1971.  
 Kahler, Bruce R. "Mary Ann "Mother" Bickerdyke: A Gilded Age Icon". John Brown to Bob Dole, 2006. 
 Kellogg, Florence Shaw.  Mother Bickerdyke, As I Knew Her. Chicago: Unity Pub. Co., 1907. 
 Largent, Kimberly J. Pearls of Blue and Gray: Women of the Civil War. Milford, Ohio: Little Miami Pub. Co., 1999.  
 Litvin, Martin. The Young Mary: 1817–1861 ; Early Years of Mother Bickerdyke, America's Florence Nightingale, and Patron Saint of Kansas. Galesburg, Ill.: Log City Books, 1976. 
 McKown, Robin. Heroic Nurses. New York: Putnam, 1966. 
 
 Osborne, Karen K. Mother Bickerdyke, Civil War Mother to the Boys. Milwaukee, Wis.: Blue & Grey Chap Books, 1990. 
 Robbins, Peggy. General Grant's "Calico Colonel". Gettysburg, Pa: National Historical Society, 1979. 
 Schroeder-Lein, Glenna R. The Encyclopedia of Civil War Medicine. Armonk, N.Y.: M.E. Sharpe, Inc., 2008.  
 Snodgrass, Mary Ellen. Historical Encyclopedia of Nursing. Santa Barbara, Calif.: ABC-CLIO, 1999.  
 Webb, Dave. Mary Bickerdyke. S.l: Kansas Heritage Center, 1985.

External links
 Mary Ann Bickerdyke,  Civil War Nurse

Finding aid for Mary Ann Bickerdyke's Papers at the Library of Congress
Short biographical sketch from PBS Civil War
Biography from Spartacus Educational
Voices of the Civil War.

1817 births
1901 deaths
American Civil War medicine
American nurses
American women nurses
American nursing administrators
American Quakers
People from Galesburg, Illinois
People from Knox County, Ohio
People from Salina, Kansas
Oberlin College alumni
United States Sanitary Commission people
Women in the American Civil War
American Civil War nurses